The 1970 King's Cup finals were held from November 8 to November 20, 1970, in Bangkok. This was the third edition of the international football competition. South Korea were set to defend the title they won in 1969 and in the final they would take the title as they defeated Thailand in the final. 

This edition was increased to 9 teams.

The Groups
One group of four teams. One group of five
Winners and runner up qualifies for the semi-finals.

Fixtures and results

Group A

Group B

Semi-finals

3rd-place match

Final

Winner

References

King's Cup
Kings Cup, 1970
Kings Cup, 1970
International association football competitions hosted by Thailand